Waca Lake is a backcountry lake in the Desolation Wilderness in the Sierra Nevada mountain range of California. It lies just south of Lake Aloha.

See also
List of lakes in California

References

Lakes of El Dorado County, California
Lakes of the Desolation Wilderness
Lakes of California
Lakes of Northern California